The 2013 World Baseball Classic (WBC) was an international professional baseball competition, held from March 2 to March 19, 2013. This was the third iteration of the WBC, following the two previous tournaments, held in 2006 and 2009.

Unlike the two previous WBCs, which consisted of the same sixteen countries, only the twelve countries that won at least one game in the 2009 WBC were guaranteed a berth in the main tournament. The automatic qualifiers were Australia, China, Cuba, Dominican Republic, Italy, Japan, Mexico, the Netherlands, Puerto Rico, South Korea, the United States, and Venezuela.  Four qualification brackets were held in late 2012 and respectively won by Canada, Taiwan, Spain, and Brazil, who joined the WBC as the final four teams (the latter two making their Classic debuts).

As in the 2006 tournament, the first round had a round-robin format, which led to South Korea being eliminated on a run difference tiebreaker.  Venezuela also failed to advance out of a tough group.  The fourth-place teams in each group – Brazil, Australia, Spain, and Mexico – had to participate in the qualifying round in order to return for the 2017 tournament.

The second round was a modified double-elimination format, as in the 2009 tournament, where the modification was that the final game of each bracket was winner-take-all, even if won by the team emerging from the loser's bracket, although that game only affected seeding as two teams advanced from each bracket.  The Netherlands improved on its surprising 2009 run by advancing to the semifinal game, as did two-time defending champion Japan. However, the two-time defending champions Japan were eliminated in the semi-finals game against stunning Puerto Rico. In the final game, the Dominican Republic defeated Puerto Rico to become the first WBC champion from the Western Hemisphere, as well as the first team to complete the WBC with an undefeated record. Robinson Canó was named the Most Valuable Player of the Classic.

Revenue-sharing dispute
The preparations for the third World Baseball Classic were complicated by a dispute between the Japanese Professional Baseball Players Association (JPBPA), the union for all Nippon Professional Baseball players, and MLB over revenue sharing. JPBPA demanded a larger share of advertising and merchandise sponsorship revenue for the tournament, a large chunk of which came from Japanese companies. MLB resisted the move in part due to the fact that the World Baseball Classic is a joint production of MLB and the MLB Player's Association, meaning that those two organizations bore the cost of the tournament.

In July 2012, the JPBPA voted unanimously to boycott the 2013 World Baseball Classic. The move was interpreted by some news outlets as a non-final decision, aimed at raising the pressure on MLB. In September 2012, Japanese players agreed to take part after reaching a compromise with tournament organizers on sharing sponsorship and licensing revenue.

Qualification

The top three teams from each pool of the first round of the 2009 World Baseball Classic automatically qualified.

Format
In the first round, each team played the other three teams in its pool once. Teams were ranked by winning percentage in the first round, with the top two teams in each pool advancing to the second round. There, the teams from Pools A and B (in Pool 1) and the teams from Pools C and D (in Pool 2) competed in a double-elimination format.

The top two teams in each pool in the second round entered the four-team single-elimination semifinals. The four qualifying teams crossed over for the semifinals, with the winner of each pool playing against the runner-up from the other pool.

In the final, the team with the higher winning percentage of games in the tournament were to be the home team. If the teams competing in the final had identical winning percentages in the tournament, then World Baseball Classic, Inc. (WBCI) would conduct a coin flip or draw to determine the home team.

In the first round, ties were to be broken in the following order of priority:

 The winner of head-to-head games between the tied teams;
 The team with the highest Team's Quality Balance (TQB=(runs scored (RS)/innings batted (IPO))–(runs against (RA)/innings pitched (IPD))) in head-to-head games between the tied teams;
 The team with the highest Earned Runs Team's Quality Balance (ER–TQB=(earned runs scored (ERS)/IPO)–(earned runs against (ERA)/IPD)) in head-to-head games between the tied teams;
 The team with the highest batting average (AVG) in head-to-head games between the tied teams;
 Drawing of lots, conducted by World Baseball Classic, Inc. (WBCI).

Rosters

The deadline for submitting provisional rosters was January 16, but teams had until February 20 to finalize their roster decisions. Many Major League Baseball (MLB) players participated. The United States provisional roster was made up entirely of players from MLB, and champions Dominican Republic provisional roster had only one player not signed to an MLB team in 2013. The Canadian team had 12 players who appeared in MLB in 2012. Japan had none and two prominent Japanese MLB players, Yu Darvish and Ichiro Suzuki, chose not to play. Though five members who competed for the Cuban national team in the 2009 WBC have since defected, the Cuban team was considered strong despite its 2nd-round sacking. Three members of MLB.com's Top 100 prospect participated: Xander Bogaerts, Eddie Rosario, and Jameson Taillon.

Venues
Eight stadiums were used during the main tournament:

Pools composition
The top 12 teams that participated in the 2009 World Baseball Classic were invited back for the 2013 tournament. Spain, Canada, Brazil, and Chinese Taipei won their pools of qualification.

Note: Numbers in parentheses indicate positions in the WBSC World Rankings at the time of the tournament.

First round

Pool A

|}

Pool B

|}

Pool C

|}

Pool D

|}

Second round

Pool 1

|}

Pool 2

|}

Championship round

Semifinals

|}

Final

|}

Final standings
Organizer WBCI has no interest in the final standings and did not compute. So, it was calculated by IBAF for the IBAF Men's Baseball World Rankings.

In the final standings, ties were to be broken in the following order of priority:

 The team with the highest Team's Quality Balance (TQB=(RS/IPO)–(RA/IPD)) in all games;
 The team with the highest Earned Runs Team's Quality Balance (ER–TQB=(ERS/IPO)–(ERA/IPD)) in all games;
 The team with the highest batting average (AVG) in all games;

Attendance
781,438 (avg. 20,037; pct. 59.5%)

First round
359,243 (avg. 14,968; pct. 50.2%)
 Pool A – 79,168 (avg. 13,195; pct. 34.2%)
 Pool B – 69,834 (avg. 11,639; pct. 58.2%)
 Pool C – 95,058 (avg. 15,843; pct. 86.7%)
 Pool D – 115,183 (avg. 19,197; pct. 45.3%)
 Chase Field – 110,705 (avg. 22,141; pct. 45.5%)
 Salt River Fields at Talking Stick – 4,478 (avg. 4,478; pct. 40.7%)

Second round
325,282 (avg. 27,107; pct. 68.8%)
 Pool 1 – 170,658 (avg. 28,443; pct. 67.7%)
 Pool 2 – 154,624 (avg. 25,771; pct. 70.1%)

Championship round
96,913 (avg. 32,304; pct. 77.1%)
 Semifinals – 61,210 (avg. 30,605; pct. 73.0%)
 Final – 35,703 (avg. 35,703; pct. 85.2%)

2013 All-World Baseball Classic team
''Note: The tournament Most Valuable Player was Robinson Canó.

Statistics leaders

Batting

* Minimum 2.7 plate appearances per game

Pitching

* Minimum 0.8 innings pitched per game
** Wang is tied with 14 others with a 0.00 ERA but he pitched the most innings with 12.0

Additional rules
Once again there were limits on the number of pitches thrown in a game, though the limits themselves were changed from the previous tournament:
 65 pitches in First Round (down from 70 in 2009)
 80 pitches in Second Round (down from 85 in 2009)
 95 pitches in Championship Round (down from 100 in 2009)

If a pitcher reached his limit during an at bat, he was allowed to finish pitching to the batter, but was removed from the game at the end of the at bat.

A pitcher must:
 Not pitch until a minimum of four days have passed since he last pitched, if he threw 50 or more pitches when he last pitched;
 Not pitch until a minimum of one day has passed since he last pitched, if he threw 30 or more pitches when he last pitched;
 Not pitch until a minimum of one day has passed since any second consecutive day on which the pitcher pitched;

For purposes of the pitcher use limitation rules, both semifinal games were to be deemed to have been played on the day of the latest semifinal game.

A mercy rule came into effect when one team led by either fifteen runs after five innings, or ten runs after seven innings in the first two rounds.

Instant replay was also available to umpires during the tournament. As was introduced in Major League Baseball during the 2008 season, replays were only used to adjudicate on home run decisions, to determine whether the ball was fair or foul, over the fence or not, and the impact of fan interference.

An alternative version of the IBAF's extra inning rule was also used. If after 12 innings the score was still tied, each half inning thereafter would have started with runners on second and first base. The runners would have been the eighth and ninth hitters due in that inning respectively. For example, if the number five hitter was due to lead off the inning, the number three hitter would have been on second base, and the number four hitter on first base. However, this rule was never actually employed in this year's Classic, as the only extra-inning game in the tournament ended prior to a 13th inning.

Media coverage
MLB Network has been announced as the English-language broadcaster of the 2013 and 2017 tournaments. ESPN Deportes provided Spanish-language coverage, and ESPN Radio had audio rights.

Sportsnet was the broadcaster in Canada and ESPN America in United Kingdom, Ireland and other parts of Europe.

Notes

References

External links
Official website

 
World Baseball Classic
World Baseball Classic
March 2013 sports events